The Rio Chipillico frog (Lithobates bwana) is a species of frog in the family Ranidae, found in Ecuador and Peru. Its natural habitats are tropical forests near fast-flowing rivers; it breeds in pools of water near rivers. It is threatened by habitat loss caused by agricultural expansion and human settlement.

References

Lithobates
Amphibians of Ecuador
Amphibians of Peru
Amphibians described in 1988
Taxonomy articles created by Polbot